Kert may refer to:

Places
 Kert, Nagorno-Karabakh
 Kert, Iran

People
Surname
Johannes Kert (1959–2021), Estonian politician and military officer
Larry Kert (1930–1991), American actor

Given name
Kert Haavistu (born 1980), Estonian footballer 
Kert Kesküla (197–2011), Estonian basketball player
Kert Kingo (born 1968), Estonian politician
Kert Kütt (born 1980), Estonian footballer
Kert Toobal (born 1979), Estonian volleyball player

Estonian masculine given names